Big W (stylized as BIG W) is an Australian chain of discount department stores, which was founded in regional New South Wales in 1964. The company is a division of Woolworths Group and as at 2019 operated 176 stores, with around 18,000 employees mainly in Australia. BIG W stocks clothing, health and beauty, garden, manchester, kitchenware, toys, pet items, office items, books, DVDs, CDs, televisions, gaming consoles, video games, some furniture items, snack food and small electrical household appliances.

History
The first BIG W store opened in 1964 at the Jesmond shopping centre in Newcastle. The original stores were full line department stores similar to a Myer and David Jones. At that time Woolworths still operated several hundred Woolworths Variety stores, which were the original Woolworths stores and carried a small range of general merchandise products.

In 1970 the BIG W name ceased to be used and the stores were converted to what were then known as Woolworth Family centres that had "a very large range of general merchandise as well as a supermarket food range". These stores were ultimately converted to supermarkets in the 1980s.

The BIG W name was resurrected with a new store in Tamworth in 1976, which was the first BIG W discount department store to open, with the successful discount department store format that continues today.

Woolworths Limited developed the BIG W brand to provide Australian shoppers with a broad range of general merchandise products in a dedicated one-stop-shop. BIG W's name reflects the complementary relationship it has with Woolworths Supermarkets and the W stands for Woolworths.

The separation of BIG W and Woolworths supermarkets was largely completed by 1989, although a few Woolworths Variety stores continued to operate into the 90s (such as the one in Rundle Mall, Adelaide).

In 2012, BIG W sponsored the then-current remake of The Price is Right.

In August 2022, BIG W opened its first small format store in Town Hall, Sydney.

Services

Previous
In 2007, BIG W began trialling optometry services in South Australia and since then, these services have been added to selected stores in Queensland, Victoria, New South Wales Tasmania and the Australian Capital Territory. In May 2019, BIG W announced the closure of all 41 BIG W Optometry stores, along with 175 job losses. This would not affect the BIG W store that housed the optometry department, and that the last optometry sessions could be held in late July. As of August 2019, all optometry stores have closed, leaving separate stores to be leased or stores within the BIG W store to be used as space for another department.

Current 

Ever since its modern format stores in 1976, BIG W stores featured Garden Centres similar to Kmart Australia and Target Australia. These facilities continued to be added throughout its store portfolio throughout the 1980s and early 2000s until they started being added to only a select few stores in the mid-late 2000s, until being retired completely in the late 2010s. However, unlike its competition, BIG W still keeps their Garden Centres active to most of their stores built with them.

BIG W were the second company in Australia to use self-checkouts, which were introduced in 2003 on a trial basis in two of Sydney's major stores and began expanding throughout Australia in late 2005.

In August 2014, BIG W launched its first party store at Rouse Hill Town Centre in New South Wales and its second at the newly refurbished Macquarie Centre, also in New South Wales. There are currently 176 stores across Australia.

In 2022, BIG W started phasing out its photo printing service citing declining demand and a growth in online photo ordering.

See also

 Department stores around the world
 Kmart Australia
 Target Australia
 Woolworths Supermarkets

References

External links

 

Department stores of Australia
Retail companies established in 1964
Australian companies established in 1964
1964 establishments in Australia
Discount stores of Australia
Woolworths Group (Australia)
Companies based in Sydney
Clothing retailers of Australia
Toy retailers of Australia